The men's light middleweight event was part of the boxing programme at the 1992 Summer Olympics. The weight class allowed boxers of up to 71 kilograms to compete. The competition was held from 27 July to 9 August 1992. 30 boxers from 30 nations competed.

Medalists

Results
The following boxers took part in the event:

First round
 Igors Šaplavskis (LAT) – BYE
 Joseph Marwa (TAN) – BYE
 Juan Carlos Lemus (CUB) def. Arkadiy Topayev (EUN), 11:0
 Markus Beyer (GER) def. Sililo Figota (NZL), 16:2
 Hendrik Simangunsong (INA) def. Raymond Downey (CAN), 12:5
 György Mizsei (HUN) def. Fabrizio de Chiara (ITA), 13:4
 Maselino Masoe (ASA) def. Hiroshi Nagashima (JPN) RSCI-3 (00:54)
 Furas Hashim (IRQ) def. Miguel Jiménez (PUR), 10:3
 Raúl Márquez (USA) def. David Defiagbon (NGR), 8:7
 Rival Cadeau (SEY) def. Mohamed Mesbahi (MAR), 5:3
 Orhan Delibaş (NED) def. Choi Ki-Soo (KOR), 3:0
 Chalit Boonsingkarn (THA) def. Lucas Franca (BRA), 16:2
 Ole Klemetsen (NOR) def. Jorge Porley (URU), RSCH-1 (02:38)
 Noureddine Meziane (ALG) def. Syed Abrar Hussain (PAK), 7:0
 Leonidas Maleckis (LTU) def. Kabary Salem (EGY), 13:6
 Robin Reid (GBR) def. Marcus Thomas (BAR), KO-1 (00:58)

Second round
 Igors Šaplavskis (LAT) def. Joseph Marwa (TAN), 14:8
 Juan Carlos Lemus (CUB) def. Markus Beyer (GER), RSCH-1 (02:55)
 György Mizsei (HUN) def. Hendrik Simangunsong (INA), 17:5
 Maselino Masoe (ASA) def. Furas Hashim (IRQ), RSCH-1 (00:44)
 Raúl Márquez (USA) def. Rival Cadeau (SEY), 20:3
 Orhan Delibaş (NED) def. Chalit Boonsingkarn (THA), RSCI-2 (01:45)
 Ole Klemetsen (NOR) def. Noureddine Meziane (ALG), 14:3
 Robin Reid (GBR) def. Leonidas Maleckis (LTU), 10:3

Quarterfinals
 Juan Carlos Lemus (CUB) def. Igors Šaplavskis (LAT), 12:2
 György Mizsei (HUN) def. Maselino Masoe (ASA), 17:3
 Orhan Delibaş (NED) def. Raúl Márquez (USA), 16:12
 Robin Reid (GBR) def. Ole Klemetsen (NOR), 20:10

Semifinals
 Juan Carlos Lemus (CUB) def. György Mizsei (HUN), 10:2
 Orhan Delibaş (NED) def. Robin Reid (GBR), 8:3

Final
 Juan Carlos Lemus (CUB) def. Orhan Delibaş (NED), 6:1

References

Light Middleweight